Babak Anvari is a British-Iranian filmmaker. He is best known for directing horror films such as Under the Shadow (2016) and Wounds (2019).

Filmography 
 Two & Two (2011)
 Under the Shadow (2016)
 Wounds (2019)
 I Came By (2022)
 ''untitled Cloverfield film (TBA)

References

External links 
 
 

Living people
Iranian diaspora film people
Iranian emigrants to the United Kingdom
Iranian film directors
Horror film directors
Outstanding Debut by a British Writer, Director or Producer BAFTA Award winners
Mass media people from Tehran
Year of birth missing (living people)
Naturalised citizens of the United Kingdom